William F. Stellberger (April 22, 1865 – November 9, 1936) was an American professional baseball player who pitched in one game for the  Providence Grays of the National League. He pitched his only major league game on October 1, a complete game loss to the Detroit Wolverines. Stellberger later played for several minor teams; Bridgeport of the Eastern League, Deluth of the Northwestern League, Greenville, Manistee, and Battle Creek of the Michigan State League, and the New Orleans Pelicans of the Southern Association. He died at the age of 71 in his hometown of Detroit, Michigan, and is interred at Woodmere Cemetery.

References

External links

 

1865 births
1936 deaths
Major League Baseball pitchers
Baseball players from Michigan
19th-century baseball players
Providence Grays players
Bridgeport Giants players
Duluth Freezers players
Mansfield (minor league baseball) players
Greenville (minor league baseball) players
Manistee (minor league baseball) players
New Orleans Pelicans (baseball) players
Battle Creek Adventists players